Round Top is a mountain located in the Catskill Mountains of New York north of New Kingston. Burnt Hill is located south of Round Top and Mill Mountain is located west-southwest.

References

Mountains of Delaware County, New York
Mountains of New York (state)